The First Lutheran Church in Ketchikan, Alaska is a historic church at 1200 Tongass Avenue.  It was designed by architect W.G. Brust of Seattle and was built in 1930 by Ketchikan local builder Carl Foss.  It is a two-story wood-frame structure, with a three-story tower at its southwest corner.  The windows along the sides are rectangular sash windows on the first level, and narrow Gothic lancet windows on the taller second level grouped in threes in rectangular openings.  The main entry is in through an arched opening in the tower, with the door topped by a multi-light transom window.

The building was added to the National Register of Historic Places in 1987.

See also
Walker-Broderick House, also built by Carl Foss and NRHP-listed in Ketchikan
National Register of Historic Places listings in Ketchikan Gateway Borough, Alaska

References

Carpenter Gothic architecture in Alaska
Carpenter Gothic church buildings in the United States
Churches completed in 1930
Gothic Revival church buildings in Alaska
Ketchikan, Alaska
Lutheran churches in Alaska
Buildings and structures on the National Register of Historic Places in Ketchikan Gateway Borough, Alaska
Churches on the National Register of Historic Places in Alaska
20th-century Lutheran churches in the United States
1930 establishments in Alaska